The Nanjing University of Chinese Medicine (a.k.a. NJUCM), is located in Nanjing, capital of China's Jiangsu province. It is jointly constructed by the People's Government of Jiangsu Province and the State Administration of Traditional Chinese Medicine of the People's Republic of China. Established in 1954, NJUCM is one of the earliest established universities of Traditional Chinese Medicine in China. And 1st rank in Traditional Chinese Medicine university in China dedicated to the study of traditional Chinese medicine.  It is a Chinese Ministry of Education Double First Class University, included in the state Double First Class University Plan.

The university has two campuses, Xianlin and Hanzhongmen, currently (as of 2018) it has nearly 20,000 enrolled students, including a number of international students. The school offers 33 undergraduate programs, 7 master programs, and 4 doctoral degree programs.

History 
NJUCM is established in 1954, which is one of the earliest established universities of Traditional Chinese Medicine in China. The name of the university was changed to Nanjing University of Chinese Medicine in 1995, former names of which are Jiangsu Traditional Training School(Chinese: 江苏省中医进修学校; pinyin: Jiāngsū Shěng Zhōngyī Jìnxiū Xuéxiào), Jiangsu Provincial School of Traditional Chinese Medicine (Chinese: 江苏省中医学校; pinyin: Jiāngsū Shěng Zhōngyī Xuéxiào), the Branch Library of Jiangsu New Medical College (Chinese: 江苏新医学院; pinyin: Jiāngsū Xīnyī Xuéyuàn), Nanjing Traditional Chinese Medicine College (Chinese: 南京中医学院; pinyin: Nánjīng Zhōngyī Xuéyuàn).

Campuses
The Nanjing University of Chinese Medicine is located in the historic city Nanjin, an ancient capital with various and long history. NJUCM has Xianlin and Hanzhongmen campuses. Currently, it has nearly 20,000 enrolled students. Xianlin is the new campus of the NJUCM that was opened up in 2002, covering 418,253 square meters of buildings for teaching, experiments, libraries, administrative offices, student dormitories, etc.

Campus Address 

Xianlin Campus: 138 Xianlin Rd., Qixia District, Nanjing, China

Hanzhongmen Campus: 282 Hanzhong Rd., Gulou District, Nanjing, China

Academics 
The university consists of 17 schools and institutes, as well as several affiliated hospitals and companies. As a leader in Chinese Medicine, NJUCM has successfully developed clinical research and teaching. Besides, the university has two library with over 1 millions volumes of printed books, which makes them one of the largest libraries holding Chinese-Medicine related books.

Library 

The first library was founded in 1954, which was known as the Library of Jiangsu Traditional Chinese Medicine Training School. Now the Jingwen Library of the University at Xianlin Campus was established in 2005 with the generous donation of Dr. Chu Ching-wen, who is a prominent educational industrialist.

Currently, the libraries have more than 3,000 kinds and 40,000 volumes of ancient books, which consist of 40% of the existing ancient Chinese Medicine books. Every year, the libraries provides an open access to 1,056 kinds of printed  Chinese and foreign journals, about 1 million Chinese and foreign electronic books, 21,000 kinds of journals as well as 96 kinds of database resources.

The Library has been transforming itself into a characteristic university library of both knowledge and research type by insistently taking the resources, technology and services as the center, with the purpose of promoting the application of Chinese medicine literature resources.

Affiliated hospitals 

 The Affiliated Hospital of Nanjing University of Chinese Medicine
 The Second Affiliated Hospital of Nanjing University of Chinese Medicine
 Nanjing TCM Hospital Affiliated to Nanjing University of Chinese Medicine
 Changzhou TCM Hospital Affiliated to Nanjing University of Chinese Medicine
 Wuxi TCM Hospital Affiliated to Nanjing University of Chinese Medicine
 Suzhou TCM Hospital Affiliated to Nanjing University of Chinese Medicine
 Taizhou TCM Hospital Affiliated to Nanjing University of Chinese Medicine
 Nantong TCM Hospital Affiliated to Nanjing University of Chinese Medicine
 Yangzhou TCM Hospital Affiliated to Nanjing University of Chinese Medicine
 Xuzhou TCM Hospital Affiliated to Nanjing University of Chinese Medicine
 Yancheng TCM Hospital Affiliated to Nanjing University of Chinese Medicine
 Bayi Hospital Affiliated to Nanjing University of Chinese Medicine
 Jiangyin TCM Hospital Affiliated to Nanjing University of Chinese Medicine
 Kunshan TCM Hospital Affiliated to Nanjing University of Chinese Medicine
 Changshu TCM Hospital Affiliated to Nanjing University of Chinese Medicine
 Jiangyan TCM Hospital Affiliated to Nanjing University of Chinese Medicine
 Zhangjiagang TCM Hospital Affiliated to Nanjing University of Chinese Medicine
 Lianyungang TCM Hospital Affiliated to Nanjing University of Chinese Medicine
 Zhenjiang TCM Hospital Affiliated to Nanjing University of Chinese Medicine
 Wujin TCM Hospital Affiliated to Nanjing University of Chinese Medicine
 Nanjing Integrated Chinese and Western Medicine Hospital Affiliated to Nanjing University of Chinese Medicine
 Taicang TCM Hospital Affiliated to Nanjing University of Chinese Medicine
 Jiangsu Integrated Chinese and Western Medicine Hospital Affiliated to Nanjing University of Chinese Medicine
 Gulou Clinical Medicine School of Integrated Chinese and Western Medicine Affiliated to Nanjing University of Chinese Medicine
 Wuxi Clinical Medicine School of Integrated Chinese and Western Medicine, Nanjing University of Chinese Medicine
 Nantong Clinical Medicine School of Integrated Chinese and Western Medicine, Nanjing University of Chinese Medicine
 Lianyungang Clinical Medicine School of Integrated Chinese and Western Medicine, Nanjing University of Chinese Medicine
 Xuzhou Central Hospital Affiliated to Nanjing University of Chinese Medicine
 Nanjing General Hospital
 Hebei Yiling Hospital Affiliated to Nanjing University of Chinese Medicine
 Huai’an TCM Hospital Affiliated to Nanjing University of Chinese Medicine
 Suqian TCM Hospital Affiliated to Nanjing University of Chinese Medicine
 Rugao TCM Hospital Affiliated to Nanjing University of Chinese Medicine

Affiliated Pharmaceutical Companies

 Jiangsu Kanion Pharmaceutical
 Wai Yuen Tong
 SZYY Group Pharmaceutical Limited

Schools & Institutes

 School of Basic Medicine
 School of the First Clinical Medicine
 School of the Second Clinical Medicine 
 School of the Third Clinical Medicine 
 School of Medicine and Life Sciences
 School of Integrative Medicine
 School of Pharmacy
 School of Health Economics and Management
 School of Nursing
 School of Foreign Languages
 School of International Education 
 School of Information Technology
 School of Psychology
 International Jingfang Institute 
 Graduate School
 School of Continued Education
 School of Humanities and Political Education

International Collaboration 
The NJUCM is one of the first advanced Chinese Medicine institutions authorized by the Ministry of Education to enroll international students, as well as students from Taiwan, Hong Kong and Macau. In 1993, NJUCM pioneered the practice of cooperating with RMIT University, Australia to facilitate the Bachelor program of Chinese Medicine. It has established 8 overseas Chinese Medicine Centers in succession respectively in Oceania, Europe and America. Its three TCM centers, Sino-Australia, Sino-Switzerland and Sino-France centers have become national-level overseas Chinese medicine center.

The NJUCM makes every effort to promote the understanding of Chinese Medicine in foreign countries with special focus in developing Confucius Institute and overseas Chinese Medicine Center. A leading Chinese Medicine Confucius Institute was established by NJUCM in collaboration with RMIT University, Australia on June 20, 2010.

The NJUCM currently has extensive communication and contact with over 90 countries and regions worldwide, and has established partnership with higher education institutions, government agencies and academic groups in over 30 countries and regions.

WHO Collaborating Center 

The NJUCM was designated as the WHO Collaborating Center for Traditional Medicine on 5 August 1983. Currently, it has entered the 9th tenure consecutively. Terms of reference are: to contribute to WHO's efforts to increase the public awareness and knowledge sharing of traditional medicine facilitating its availability, accessibility and affordability in the member states; to contribute to WHO's efforts to encourage the traditional medicine communication and cooperation within and between countries strengthening regional and global networks.

WHO collaboration annual reports

Collaboration News Briefs

Contacts with government
Inter-university communication
Academic exchange
Confucius institute
Collaboration projects

Notable alumni
Chen Guangcheng, civil rights activist
Lang Yongchun, Chinese television host

References

 
Universities and colleges in Nanjing